The Southern Nevada Water Authority (SNWA) is a government agency that was founded in 1991 to manage Southern Nevada's water needs on a regional basis in Clark County.

SNWA provides wholesale water treatment and delivery for the greater Las Vegas Valley and is responsible for acquiring and managing long-term water resources for Southern Nevada.

From its inception, the SNWA has worked to acquire additional water resources, manage existing and future water resources, construct and operate regional water facilities and promote water conservation.

The SNWA is governed by a seven-member board of directors, which comprises one elected official from each governing board of the SNWA's seven member agencies. While the Board of Directors sets policy direction for the SNWA, the Las Vegas Valley Water District is responsible for the day-to-day management of the organization through an agreement between the SNWA member agencies.

Member agencies
 Big Bend Water District (Laughlin): Steve Sisolak (Democratic)
 Boulder City: Peggy Leavitt (Republican)
 Clark County Water Reclamation District: James B. Gibson (Democratic)
 Henderson: John Marz (Republican)
 Las Vegas: Bob Coffin (Democratic)
 Las Vegas Valley Water District: Marilyn Kirkpatrick (Democratic)
 North Las Vegas: John Jay Lee (Democratic)

Water supply and distribution
Southern Nevada gets nearly 90 percent of its water from the Colorado River. The other 10 percent of the water comes from groundwater that is pumped out through existing wells within Clark County. Perchlorates in ground water in Henderson and associated runoff into the Las Vegas Wash has been a concern since 1997.

Treatment facilities 
 Alfred Merritt Smith Water Treatment Facility
 River Mountains Water Treatment Facility

These facilities first treat the water with ozone to kill any potentially harmful microscopic organisms. As the water leaves the water treatment facilities, chlorine is added to protect it on the way to customers' taps. Since 2000, SNWA has also added fluoride to the municipal water supply.

Major distribution systems
 East Valley Lateral
 North Valley Lateral
 South Valley Lateral
 West Valley Lateral

Reservoirs
 Brock Reservoir which is partly funded by SNWA - 
 Burkholder Reservoir - 
 Decatur Reservoir - 
 Grand Teton Reservoir - 
 Horizon Ridge Reservoir -

Major pumping stations
 Decatur Pumping Station ( capacity)
 Foothills Pumping Station ( capacity
 Gowan Pumping Station ( capacity)
 Lamb Pumping Station ( capacity)
 River Mountains Pumping Station ( capacity)
 Simmons Pumping Station ( capacity)
 Sloan Pumping Station ( capacity)

Trivia 
The famous Twitter user Nemets was working here.

See also
 Clark County Commission
 Water fluoridation controversy

References

External links
 SNWA website
 Fluoride
 Clark, Lincoln, and White Pine Counties Groundwater Development Project
 Yelp reviews
 

1991 establishments in Nevada
Government agencies established in 1991
Government of Clark County, Nevada
Water management authorities in the United States